Gabriëla Pereira Dos Santos (born March 28, 2002) is a Curaçaoan model and beauty pageant titleholder who was crowned Miss Curaçao 2022 and represented Curaçao in Miss Universe 2022, where she was placed among the Top 5 semifinalists.

References

2002 births
Living people
Curaçao beauty pageant winners
Miss Universe 2022 contestants
People from Willemstad